Official chapters of the Jewish Defense League as well as national and regional offices:

National (United States)

Arizona chapter
In October 2000, after an absence of more than 20 years, the Jewish Defense League once again had an Arizona chapter. Its first event coincided with a solidarity rally for Israel at Temple Chai of Phoenix, held on October 29, 2000, hosted by the Arizona Jewish community. At that time, there were 27 members; 20 in Phoenix, five in Tucson, and two at the University of Northern Arizona in Flagstaff. Irv Rubin, then  national JDL chairman, worked closely with Arizona chairman, Ian Rakow, to establish the chapter. Rakow stated, that one of the main goals of the chapter, "is to educate," and said that, "depending upon their level of comfort," members can attend meetings, protests, and rallies, or write articles for the website.

Following a string of anti-Semitic incidents, including vandalism using anti-Semitic graffiti in Prescott, Arizona, JDL of Arizona offered a one-thousand dollar reward for "information leading to the arrest and conviction of those responsible for spray-painting threatening, anti-Semitic graffiti on the headquarters of Prescott’s Safe Schools, Safe Students," as well as a free Carrying Concealed Weapons class held in February, 2001 in Prescott, Arizona, in order to obtain Concealed Weapons Permits, "with the goal of empowering the law-abiding citizens against future victimization and escalation of these terrorist acts." The chapter disbanded in January 2002.

California

Los Angeles chapter
The Jewish Defense League of Los Angeles is also the site of the JDL International Headquarters. They can be contacted at P.O. Box 480370, Los Angeles, CA 90048. The Chairman and National Chairman and CEO is Shelley Rubin, and the Vice-Chairman and National Vice-President is Ari Rubin.

Northern California chapter

San Diego chapter

Chicago chapter
The Jewish Defense League of Chicago is under the leadership of Sholom Ben-David. In 2002, the Chicago JDL had a car as part of its Mobile Response Unit in which they patrolled synagogues.

Washington, DC chapter
The Washington, D.C. chapter of the Jewish Defense League was established on April 26, 2017 and is run by Chairman David Bar-Lev. Bar-Lev was formerly the Chairman of the now-defunct Jewish Defense League of Tampa Bay from September 1999 to October 2004. The Jewish Defense League of Washington, DC maintained a Twitter page prior to its suspension that sought to recruit new members to join its ranks.

Louisiana chapter
The Jewish Defense League of Louisiana was formed on July 27 of 2008. JDL Louisiana created a now defunct website, www.louisianajdl.org, on July 20, 2008. It currently operates a new website, Twitter that "tweets" about events and blog posts by the JDL, as well as Jewish and Israeli news, and a Facebook group. Their motto is, "Your Jewish Neighborhood Watch."

Michigan chapter
The Jewish Defense League of Michigan was formed in 2009.

South Carolina chapter

Texas chapter
The Jewish Defense League of Texas was formed on August 14, 2006 under the leadership of Ben Johnson in Waco, Texas. Their expressed goal is, "...to bring unity with those who wish to confront those extremist groups whose sole aim is the destruction of the Jewish People."

International

Canada

Canadian chapter
The Jewish Defense League of Canada was under the leadership of Meir Weinstein from the late 1970s until 2021, when Weinstein left the group. JDL Canada resumed activities in 2006 after a long absence. Since their reactivation, they have counter-protested against pro-Palestinian activists, picketed a conference on "Israeli apartheid" at the University of Toronto, protested the Ontario Secondary School Teachers Federation for considering support of a boycott of Israel, and  protested the construction of a mosque led by an alleged "Islamist." In April 2007, JDL Canada organized a picket outside of Paul Fromm's disciplinary hearing at the Ontario College of Teachers. This led to two arrests after JDL activists were accused of assaulting the controversial far-right figure.
On October 23, JDL Canada sponsored Israeli right winger Moshe Feiglin to come and address the Toronto Jewish community at a local synagogue.

In March 2009, JDL Canada wrote an open letter to the Canadian government asking them to ban British politician George Galloway from entering Canada, which the government did. Galloway was scheduled to speak in Toronto at an event called "Resisting War from Gaza to Kandahar". In 2010, a Federal Court judge imposed a ruling, calling the ban "a flawed and overreaching interpretation of the standards under Canadian law...". Galloway was now allowed to visit the country.

London, Ontario chapter
The Jewish Defense league of London, Ontario was established in November 2009. The chairman is Pesach Ovadyah. The chapters Facebook group  has an active Discussions Board. As of September 30, 2016, this Facebook group no longer appears to be active.

Europe

German chapter
The Jewish Defense League of Germany (German: Jüdische Verteidigungsliga) was formed during September 2009. The chairman is Steven Weigang. The German Chapter includes both the Austrian and Switzerland area.

Swedish chapter
The Jewish Defense League of Sweden was formed in 2008. The chairman is Adi. He was appointed by then JDL Europe National Director, Ariel Nahal.

French chapter
The French JDL chapter was formed in October 2000.

The chapter has garnered some interest by the media after some alleged violent acts by some of its members, and a condemnation in 2003. Some prominent political parties and movements in France have publicly supported a petition to ban the French JDL. The chapter has forged ties with Marine Le Pen, a fellow opponent of the new anti-semitism in France.

Paris chapter

Lyon chapter
JDL Lyon was founded on May 31, 2009.

Holland chapter
JDL Holland was founded by 8 Jews during Hanukkah, 2010.

Denmark chapter

Hungarian chapter 
The JDL Hungary was founded by about ten Jews from Hungary in October 2010.

United Kingdom chapter
The Jewish Defense League of the United Kingdom was reformed in June 2009.

Other

South African chapter
The Jewish Defense League of South Africa was re-formed during May 2009. The chairman is Mordechai.

References

External links
 
 Jewish Defense League Germany
 Jewish Defense League Poland
 Jewish Defense League Canada
 Jewish Defense League France

Jewish-American political organizations
Zionist organizations